Sofian Taïbi, sometimes spelt as Sofiane Taïbi, (born August 5, 1987) is an Algerian football player.

Club career
A product of the FC Lorient junior ranks, Taïbi joined Championnat National-side Cherbourg in 2006 before moving to Pau FC in 2008. On June 30, 2009, he went on trial with Ligue 1 side Valenciennes FC but was not offered a deal.

On January 5, 2010, Taïbi signed with Ligue 2 side FC Istres. He made his debut for the club on February 19, 2010 in a 2-1 league loss to Le Havre AC.

In January 2019, he returned to Blagnac FC.

International career
In 2004, Taïbi was called up to the Algerian Under-20 National Team to take part in the Tournoi de Mulhouse. Despite the team losing in the semi-finals, Taïbi was chosen as the Player of the Tournament.

References

External links
 
 FootMercato Profile
 
 Sofian Taïbi at Footballdatabase
 

1987 births
Living people
Algerian footballers
French sportspeople of Algerian descent
Ligue 2 players
Championnat National players
Championnat National 2 players
Championnat National 3 players
AS Cherbourg Football players
FC Istres players
Pau FC players
UJA Maccabi Paris Métropole players
Toulouse Rodéo FC players
US Albi players
Blagnac FC players
Association football midfielders